Tricholeiochiton fagesii is a species of caddisfly belonging to the family Hydroptilidae.

It is native to Europe.

References

Hydroptilidae